José Oliveros de la Torre (born 29 April 1948) is a Mexican racewalker. He competed at the 1968 Summer Olympics and the 1972 Summer Olympics.

References

1948 births
Living people
Athletes (track and field) at the 1968 Summer Olympics
Athletes (track and field) at the 1972 Summer Olympics
Mexican male racewalkers
Olympic athletes of Mexico
Place of birth missing (living people)
Pan American Games medalists in athletics (track and field)
Pan American Games bronze medalists for Mexico
Athletes (track and field) at the 1971 Pan American Games
Medalists at the 1971 Pan American Games
20th-century Mexican people